Ilja Sirosh (born 19 March 1998) is an Estonian chess International Master (2019), Estonian Chess Championship winner (2017).

Chess career
In 2017, in Tallinn Ilja Sirosh won Estonian Chess Championship.

Ilja Sirosh played for Estonia in Chess Olympiad:
 In 2018, at fourth board in the 43rd Chess Olympiad in Batumi (+4, =5, -2).

In 2019, he was awarded the FIDE International Master (IM) title.

References

External links

Ilja Sirosh chess games at 365Chess.com

1998 births
Living people
Chess International Masters
Estonian chess players
Chess Olympiad competitors
Sportspeople from Sillamäe